FAM131A (Family with Sequence Similarity 131 Member A) is a protein that is encoded by the FAM131A gene in humans. Aliases for FAM131A include C3orf40, FLAT715, and PRO1378.

Gene
The gene, FAM131A, which is found on the plus strand of chromosome 3 (3q27.1), spans 7,847 base pairs in humans. The FAM131A gene transcribes an mRNA sequence that is 2,437 nucleotides. FAM131A is most highly expressed in the brain, with a low tissue specificity.

Protein
The FAM131A protein in humans is 366 amino acids in length, with a theoretical molecular weight of 39.5 kDa and a theoretical isoelectric point of 4.59. There have only been two isoforms found for the protein this gene encodes in humans, and isoform two is shorter at the N-terminus than isoform one due to amino acids 1-85 being absent in isoform two. It was also determined that Asparagine, Threonine, and Isoleucine are represented less in the FAM131A protein in comparison to most human proteins. However, Serine is more highly represented in the FAM131A protein in comparison to most human proteins. The FAM131A protein is predicted to be contained within the nucleus and in the nucleolus, and is predicted to be primarily localized to the nucleoli rim within the cell.

Post-translational modifications
Five different post-translational modification cites have been predicted for the FAM131A protein. These include three different theoretical sumoylation sites and two different theoretical lysine acetylation sites.

Interacting proteins
A few proteins have been found to be co-expressed alongside the FAM131 protein, including Von Willebrand Factor A Domain-Containing 5B2 (VWA5B2), Grid 2 Interacting Protein (GRID2IP), and Chordin (CHRD).

Homology

Orthologs were found for FAM131A in mammals (sequence identity ranging from 73.6%-92.3%), reptiles (sequence identity ranging from 48.5%-56.4%), birds (sequence identity ranging from 49.6%-54.0%), amphibians (sequence identity ranging from 47.1%-52.1%), and fish (sequence identity ranging from 26.2%-56.5%). The furthest date of divergence was found in fish, specifically Pretromyzon marinus, otherwise known as the Sea lamprey, at 599 million years ago. FAM131A was not found in any invertebrates, which could indicate that FAM131A is restricted to vertebrates.

Table of orthologs

Clinical significance
Studies have found having high expression of FAM131A is prognostically unfavorable for patients with ovarian cancer or endometrial cancer.

References